Emma Wilson,  (born 1967) is a British academic and writer, specialising in French literature and cinema. She is Professor of French Literature and the Visual Arts at the University of Cambridge and a fellow of Corpus Christi College.

Early life and education
Emma Wilson is the daughter of novelist Jacqueline Wilson and her former husband, William Millar Wilson, a police officer. She was a scholarship student at Surbiton High School and then studied French and Latin as an undergraduate at Cambridge. She then stayed on to do a PhD in the French department. Her thesis was entitled The pain of the pleasure of the text: Tournier, reading and sexuality.

Academic career
Wilson then got a post as a university lecturer at Cambridge. She is a fellow of Corpus Christi College, Cambridge, and Professor of French Literature and the Visual Arts at the University of Cambridge. She was previously Reader in Contemporary French Literature and Film and head of Cambridge's Department of French.

In 2022, she was elected a Fellow of the British Academy (FBA), the United Kingdom's national academy for the humanities and social sciences.

Research
As a researcher, Wilson is author of six books and over twenty articles published in scholarly journals in the field of modern languages and film. Her published work includes book studies of Alain Resnais and Krzysztof Kieslowski as well as specific work on writers such as Marcel Proust, Marguerite Duras, Hélène Cixous and Michel Tournier. As well as her contribution to these author fields, however, Wilson's writing has applications to critical theory. In her 1996 work, Sexuality and the Reading Encounter, Wilson makes a contribution to reader response theory in relation to feminism and queer theory. She argues for the potential for change in the reader's identity through reading. The encounter between reader and text, she says, depends "not on pre-constructed identities, but on the very performance of identity in the process of reading." Wilson is particularly interested in the way that readers position themselves in relation to representations of desiring relations.

Wilson's 2003 study of the cinematic treatment of missing children, Cinema's Missing Children, was described as "a book rich in academic and cultural backstory".

Contribution to the dissemination of French culture
On 6 May 2009, Wilson was awarded an Ordre des Palmes académiques Chevalier (knight) medal by the French Ambassador to the United Kingdom, Maurice Gourdault-Montagne. This prestigious award is awarded by the French government to academics and educators. It recognises Wilson's sustained contribution to the dissemination of French culture and to education. As well as her active contribution to the teaching and research of her department, Wilson has set up a number of links between Cambridge University and French institutions such as the École Normale Supérieure-Lettres et Sciences humaines in Lyon with which Cambridge now has a very successful ERASMUS programme.

Published work
 Love, Mortality, and the Moving Image (Basingstoke: Palgrave Macmillan, 2012) 
 Atom Egoyan (Urbana, Illinois: University of Illinois Press, 2009) 
 Alain Resnais (Manchester: Manchester University Press, 2006) 
 Cinema's Missing Children (Wallflower, 2003)
 Memory and Survival: The French Cinema of Krzysztof Kieslowski (Oxford: Legenda, 2000)
 French Cinema since 1950: Personal Histories (Duckworth, 1999) 
 Sexuality and the Reading Encounter: Identity and Desire in Proust, Duras, Cixous and Tournier (Oxford: Oxford University Press, 1996) 
 (editor) Sexuality and Masquerade: The Dedalus Book of Sexual Ambiguity (Dedalus, 1996)

References

Further reading
 Kate Ince, Review of Sexuality and the Reading Encounter: Identity and Desire in Proust, Duras, Tournier and Cixous, The Modern Language Review Vol. 92, No. 3 (July 1997), pp. 741–742.
 Michael Worton, Review of Sexuality and the Reading Encounter: Identity and Desire in Proust, Duras, Cixous and Toumier, French Studies 52, 1998; pp. 222–223.
 Martha Noel Evans, Review of Sexuality and the Reading Encounter, Modern Philology 96 no.2 (1998), p. 284.
 Review of Cinema's Missing Children by James Oliphant for PopMatters.
 Review of Cinema's Missing Children by Antonio Pasolini for Kamera.co.uk.
 'Kinds of Blue': Review of Cinema's Missing Children by Richard Armstrong for Audience Magazine, 2005.
 Phil Powrie 'Review: Memory and Survival: The French Cinema of Krzysztof Kieslowski', French Studies 56, Apr 2002; pp. 288–289.
 Phil Powrie, 'Review of French Cinema Since 1950: Personal Histories', French Studies 54, 2000  pp. 550–551.

External links
 Emma Wilson's page at the University of Cambridge

1967 births
Living people
Fellows of Corpus Christi College, Cambridge
Academics of the University of Cambridge
English literary critics
Literary critics of French
Alumni of the University of Cambridge
People educated at Surbiton High School
Chevaliers of the Ordre des Palmes Académiques
Fellows of the British Academy